The Santa Teresa Port of Entry is a border crossing between Santa Teresa, New Mexico and San Jerónimo, Chihuahua. It was built in 1992 to relieve pressure from the busy El Paso BOTA Port of Entry, a short distance to the east, and started operating on January 12, 1993. General Services Administration is currently increasing the capacity of the port of entry, taking advantage of the available land.  The crossing is open daily from 6am until midnight. The station has three commercial vehicle lanes and four passenger lanes. The port of entry is located forty-two miles south of Las Cruces, New Mexico, and around twenty minutes from downtown El Paso, Texas. It used as a filming location in the Better Call Saul episode "Fifi."

See also
 List of Mexico–United States border crossings

References

Mexico–United States border crossings
Buildings and structures in Doña Ana County, New Mexico
1992 establishments in New Mexico
Transport infrastructure completed in 1992